Candelariella flavosorediata is a species of lichen in the family Candelariaceae. Found in Réunion, it was described as a new species in 2021 by lichenologists Klaus Kalb and André Aptroot. Here it was found growing on tree bark in scrub. The specific epithet flavosorediata refers to the yellow soredia that cover most of the lichen thallus.

References

flavosorediata
Lichen species

Lichens described in 2021
Lichens of Réunion
Taxa named by André Aptroot
Taxa named by Klaus Kalb